Ixora euosmia is a species of flowering plant in the family Rubiaceae. It is endemic to southern Nigeria and southwestern Cameroon.

References

External links
World Checklist of Rubiaceae

euosmia
Flora of Nigeria
Endangered plants
Taxonomy articles created by Polbot